Wing Toy is a 1921 American silent drama film directed by Howard M. Mitchell and starring Shirley Mason, Raymond McKee, Edward McWade, Harry Northrup, and Betty Schade. The film was released by Fox Film Corporation on January 30, 1921.

Cast
Shirley Mason as Wing Toy
Raymond McKee as Bob Harris
Edward McWade as Wong
Harry Northrup as Ye Low (as Harry S. Northrup)
Betty Schade as White Lily
Scott McKee as The Mole

Preservation
The film is now considered lost.

See also
List of lost films
1937 Fox vault fire

References

External links

1921 drama films
Silent American drama films
1921 films
American silent feature films
American black-and-white films
Fox Film films
Lost American films
1921 lost films
Lost drama films
Films directed by Howard M. Mitchell
1920s American films